The 1937–38 season was the 43rd season of competitive football by Southampton and the club's 16th in the Second Division of the Football League. Despite an appalling start which saw the side spend much of the first month of the campaign in the relegation zone, the Saints finished the season 15th in the league table – their highest position in four years. With manager Tom Parker entering his first full season as Southampton manager, the club made a large number of signings in the summer, including high-scoring winger Harry Osman and young inside-forward Ted Bates, who would go on to make over 200 appearances for the club and serve as manager for almost 20 years. Southampton finished the 1937–38 season with 15 wins, nine draws and 18 losses, six positions but just three points above the first relegation place.

Southampton entered the 1937–38 FA Cup in the third round against fellow Second Division strugglers Nottingham Forest. Despite enjoying the majority of chances on goal and going into half-time on level terms, the Saints lost 1–3 to Forest, exiting the tournament at the same stage as in all but one of the previous ten seasons. In addition to the Second Division and the FA Cup, Southampton played three friendly games during the 1937–38 season. The first, against a side put together by the Army Football Association (FA) in February, ended in a 7–2 win with Gerry Kelly scoring four and Ray Parkin scoring three. The second friendly saw Southampton beating a team representing the North Dorset FA 8–0 in April. The final friendly in May was against the newly crowned First Division champions Arsenal, which they lost 1–2.

The club used 29 different players during the 1937–38 season and had ten different goalscorers. Their top scorer was new outside-left Harry Osman, who scored 22 goals in 40 appearances in the Second Division. Fellow new arrival Ray Parkin scored eight league goals, while Arthur Holt was third on seven goals. 19 players were signed by the club during the campaign, with nine released and sold to other clubs. The average attendance at The Dell during 1937–38 was 16,592 – the highest of any season to date. The highest attendance was 25,561 against Aston Villa on 4 September 1937; the lowest was 7,870 against Bradford on 2 February 1938.

Background and transfers
Having taken over as Southampton manager just a few months before the end of the last campaign, Tom Parker made numerous signings in the summer before the start of the 1937–38 season. Many of the new players came from his previous club Norwich City, chief among whom was inside-forward Ted Bates, who joined on his 19th birthday. Bates quickly established himself as a key player in the Saints side and would go on to make over 200 appearances for the club in a 16-year playing career, before holding numerous coaching roles and serving as manager for almost 20 years, taking them to the First Division for the first time in their history in 1966. Other imports from Norwich in the summer were right-half Stan Cutting, who had to wait until 1939–40 to make his only few first-team appearances; Alf Day, who became first choice at right-half upon joining, Jack Scott, who made just one appearance at centre-forward during his first year, and full-back George Woodford, who made a handful of appearances on both the right and the left.

Other signings in the summer included centre-half David Affleck, who joined from Clapton Orient for the biggest fee paid by the club since Johnny McIlwaine's £2,650 signing in 1930; centre-forward Billy Dunn, who was brought in from Brentford for £750 and scored a handful of goals in the first half of the season, goalkeeper Sam Warhurst, who joined from Bradford City and took over as first choice in his position; right winger Billy Bevis, who switched from local rivals Portsmouth, and had been first seen by Parker during a trial at Norwich; centre-forward Benny Gaughran, who was transferred for free from Scottish side Celtic; and left winger Harry Osman, who joined free from Plymouth Argyle and scored 22 goals in his debut season. The club also signed two players on amateur terms – centre-half Norman Chalk from Woolston Wednesday and inside-forward Phil Griggs from Spring Albion – neither of whom were able to break into the first team and failed to make an appearance during their first season at the club.

With so many new players joining the squad in the summer, inevitably several players also left the club. Forward Dick Neal, who had played consistently for the Saints since he joined halfway through the 1931–32 season and made 186 appearances, left in May to join Bristol City in the Third Division South. Also departing in May was Welsh half-back Billy Moore, who had made just one appearance in his single season with the Saints, and left to join First Division title challengers Wolverhampton Wanderers (although his stay was cut short due to injury). In June, Southampton lost two players: 1936–37 top scorer Jimmy Dunne, who returned to Ireland to serve as a player-coach at Shamrock Rovers, and fellow forward Fred Tully, who had played over 100 times for the Saints since 1933 before moving down to Clapton Orient in the Third Division South. Winger Laurie Fishlock, who had spent the whole of 1936–37 with the England cricket team, was sent out on trial to Fulham during the summer; he would later move to Gillingham in January 1938.

Southampton's transfer activity continued throughout the 1937–38 season. In September 1937, Parker paid recently-promoted Blackpool £2,200 for Frank Hill, who quickly took over as the side's first choice left-half. Inside-forward Ray Parkin also moved from the First Division, signing from Middlesbrough for a fee of £1,500. Also joining in September were Gerry Kelly from Port Vale, who played at centre-forward and outside-right, South African forward Jimmy Woolf, who made just one appearance at inside-right, and amateur right-back Fred Williams, who made his professional debut the next season. The final signing of the season was half-back George Smith, who signed on amateur terms. Before the end of 1937, Southampton accepted a £1,000 offer for Benny Gaughran – who had joined in the summer – from top-flight side Sunderland, as well as selling Ted Withers to Bristol Rovers in the division below. In January 1938, Billy Kingdon joined Yeovil & Petters United as player-manager. Goalkeeper Bert Scriven retired in April.

Players transferred in

Players transferred out

Players sent out on trial

Players retired

Second Division

Southampton had an awful start to the 1937–38 league campaign, picking up just three points from draws in their first seven fixtures. The side lost 3–4 to Norwich City on the opening day of the season and did not score again in their next five games: 0–1 and 0–5 against Chesterfield, 0–0 against Aston Villa, 0–2 against Bradford, and 0–0 against Plymouth Argyle. After a 3–3 draw against West Ham United on 18 September which included the side's first goal in 524 minutes of play, the Saints found themselves in the relegation zone just one point above bottom-placed Fulham. A surprise 2–1 away win over recently-relegated Manchester United started off a drastic improvement in form, during which time they also picked up three consecutive victories over fellow strugglers Sheffield Wednesday (5–2), Stockport County (4–1) and Barnsley (2–0). This run saw the Saints move up as high as 15th in the Second Division league table. The club's form levelled out in the run-up to Christmas, as they picked up key wins over lower-ranked sides and continued to lose against those challenging for higher positions in the table; by the end of 1937, they sat 18th in the league with seven wins, five draws, and nine defeats.

January started with a 3–1 home win over Norwich City, followed by three straight defeats away to Aston Villa, Coventry City and West Ham United. Immediately after this, however, the team went on an unbeaten run of eight games, which included five victories (over Bradford, Blackburn Rovers, Barnsley, Luton Town and Newcastle United). The unexpected string of results saw the team move up from 18th all the way to 8th in the league table – the highest position they would reach all season. Following this, however, the Saints would pick up just two more wins and one draw from their last nine fixtures, which included a third 0–5 defeat of the campaign – this time against Tottenham Hotspur – as well as two 0–4 losses against Coventry City and Plymouth Argyle. The team scored just eight goals during this nine-game period. Southampton finished the season 15th in the Second Division league table with 15 wins, nine draws and 18 losses, three points above Barnsley in the first relegation spot.

List of match results

Final league table

Results by matchday

FA Cup

Southampton entered the 1937–38 FA Cup in the third round, facing fellow Second Division club Nottingham Forest. Forest opened the scoring after 20 minutes, but the Saints "dominated much" of the game and equalised through Billy Dunn before half-time. The hosts went ahead almost immediately after the break, and despite Southampton almost equalising again, eventually scored a third goal just before full-time.

Other matches
Outside the league and the FA Cup, Southampton played three friendly games during the 1937–38 season. The first was against a team put together by the Army Football Association, which the Saints won 7–2 thanks to goals from Gerry Kelly (four) and Ray Parkin (three). The second, against a North Dorset FA team, Southampton also won 8–0; Arthur Holt and Kelly scored one each, with five goals scored by an unknown player with the name "Lock" and one more scored by a player called "Wall". A final friendly saw Southampton hosting top-flight side Arsenal, who beat the hosts 2–1.

Player details
Southampton used 29 different players during the 1937–38 season, eight of whom scored during the campaign. The team played in a 2–3–5 formation throughout, using two full-backs, three half-backs, two outside forwards, two inside forwards and a centre-forward. Goalkeeper Sam Warhurst featured in more games than any other Southampton player, appearing in all but the final league game of the season against Plymouth Argyle; new outside-left Harry Osman played in all but two league fixtures, missing the Argyle game as well as a fixture against Tottenham Hotspur two weeks prior. Osman also finished as the season's top goalscorer with 22 goals in the league; he was followed by fellow new signing Ray Parkin with eight league goals, followed by Arthur Holt on seven.

Squad statistics

Most appearances

Top goalscorers

Footnotes

References

Bibliography

External links
Southampton F.C. official website

Southampton F.C. seasons
Southampton